Senator Bray may refer to:

Joan Bray (born 1945), Missouri State Senate
Rodric Bray (born 1969), Indiana State Senate
William M. Bray (1880–1964), Wisconsin State Senate